The  Edmonton Eskimos season was the 54th season for the team in the Canadian Football League and their 63rd overall. The Eskimos improved upon their 7–11 record from 2010, after winning their eighth game on October 10, 2011, while also securing a berth in the playoffs in that same game. The Eskimos finished in 2nd place in the West Division with an 11–7 record and hosted a playoff game for the first time since 2004, ending the CFL's longest active drought. The Eskimos defeated their Alberta rivals, the Calgary Stampeders, 33–19 in the West Semi-Final, but lost to the BC Lions 40–23 in the West Final.

Offseason

CFL draft
The 2011 CFL Draft took place on Sunday, May 8, 2011. The Eskimos had four selections in the draft, with the first coming in the second spot overall. Edmonton was then able to select the number one ranked player in offensive linemen Scott Mitchell. After a trade with the Hamilton Tiger-Cats, the Eskimos acquired the fifth overall pick and selected Nathan Coehoorn, who was described as the most "pro-ready" receiver available in the draft. Edmonton also selected Ted Laurent in the 2011 supplemental draft, and must forfeit a second-round 2012 draft pick.

Notable transactions 

*Later traded back to the Winnipeg Blue Bombers
**Later traded back to the Hamilton Tiger-Cats
***Later traded to the Toronto Argonauts

Preseason

Regular season

Season standings

Season schedule

Total attendance: 311,629 
Average attendance: 34,625 (58.2%)

Roster

Coaching staff

Playoffs

Schedule

Bracket

*-Team won in Overtime.

West Semi-Final

West Final

References

Edmonton Eskimos Season, 2011
Edmonton Elks seasons
Edmonton Eskimos